was the twelfth Shikken (1312–1315) of the Kamakura shogunate.

Bibliography 
 
 

1279 births
1315 deaths
Hōjō clan
People of Kamakura-period Japan